The 2021 Atlanta Reign season was the Atlanta Reign's third season in the Overwatch League and the team's third under head coach Brad "Sephy" Rajani. The team qualified for three of the four midseason tournaments but fell short of reaching the finals each time. For the third consecutive season, the team qualified for the season playoffs. The Reign appeared in the 2021 Grand Finals, the franchise's first Grand Finals appearance, but lost to the Shanghai Dragons, 0–4. Rookie damage player Oh "Pelican" Se-hyun was named the league's Rookie of the Year.

Preceding offseason

Roster changes 
The Reign entered the free agency with six free agents, four of which became free agents due to the Reign not exercising the option to retain the player for another year.

Acquisitions 
The Reign's first offseason acquisition was Oh "Pelican" Se-hyun, a damage player who had recently won Overwatch Contenders Korea with team O2 Blast, on November 13, 2020. Atlanta did not sign another player until February; on February 11, 2021, they signed Kai "Kai" Collins, a damage player who had signed with the Los Angeles Valiant in late 2020 but was released after the team dropped all of their players.

Departures 
None of the Reign's free agents returned, three of which signing with other teams, beginning with damage player Jeong "Erster" Jun signing with the Shanghai Dragons on November 17, 2020. The Reign lost two more players in Tank player Nathan "Frd" Goebel and support player Anthony "Fire" King, both of whom signed with the Vancouver Titans on December 1, 2020. On January 4, 2021, support player Dusttin "Dogman" Bowerman announced his retirement. Two other free agents, tank player Garrett "Saucy" Roland and damage player Park "Pokpo" Hyeon-jun, did not sign with another team in the 2021 offseason. Outside of their free agents, the team released damage player Hugo "SharP" Sahlberg on February 10, 2021, giving life to rumors that the team was looking to sign former Los Angeles Valiant damage player Kai "Kai" Collins.

Regular season 
The Reign began their 2021 season on April 17, playing against the Florida Mayhem in the May Melee qualifiers; they lost their opener 1–3. Atlanta faced the Toronto Defiant the following day; despite starting the match with a 2–0 lead, the Reign lost the match 2–3. The Reign found their first win of the season on April 29 with a 3–0 sweep over the Paris Eternal. Atlanta's final match in the May Melee qualifiers was on May 1 against the San Francisco Shock. Needing a win to advance to the knockout round, Atlanta opened the match with a 1–0 lead, thanks in part to a strong performance by rookie damage player Se-hyun "Pelican" Oh playing as Mei. However, they lost three of the following four maps to lose the match 2–3. The 1–3 record in the qualifiers failed to advance the Reign to the regional knockouts.

The team found success in the following tournament cycle, the June Joust; after going 3–1 in the qualifiers, the Reign defeated the San Francisco Shock in the regional knockout finals to advance to the June Joust tournament. However, the team lost in the lower bracket finals to the Shanghai Dragons by a 0–3 scoreline.

Atlanta found similar results in the Summer Showdown, defeating the Los Angeles Gladiators in the regional finals to advance to their second consecutive midseason tournament. The Reign ultimately fell in the first round of the lower bracket in a 2–3 loss to the Dallas Fuel.

In the final tournament cycle, the Countdown Cup, the Reign qualified for their third consecutive tournament appearance. However, Reign rookie Oh "Pelican" Se-hyun suffered a collapsed lung prior to the tournament. Atlanta fell in the tournament to the Chengdu Hunters by a score of 0–3. The team finished the regular season with 11 wins, 5 losses, 13 league points, and the fifth seed in the season playoffs.

Oh "Pelican" Se-hyun was awarded the league's Rookie of the Year award and was an MVP candidate for the 2021 regular season.

Playoffs 

In the first round of the 2021 season playoffs, the Reign fell to the third-seeded Chengdu Hunters, 2–3, sending Atlanta to the lower bracket of the tournament. Atlanta ran through the lower bracket, defeating the eighth-seeded Washington Justice, 3–0, the fourth-seeded Los Angeles Gladiators, 3–2 the sixth-seeded San Francisco Shock, 3–1, and the second-seeded Dallas Fuel, 3–1. With a run through the lower bracket, the Reign advanced to the 2021 Overwatch League Grand Finals. In the finals, the Reign faced the top-seeded Shanghai Dragons; Atlanta was swept 0–4 in the matchup.

Final roster

Standings

Game log

Regular season 

|2021 season schedule

Postseason

References 

Atlanta Reign
Atlanta Reign
Atlanta Reign seasons